Pracinha is a municipality in the state of São Paulo in Brazil. The population is 4,212 (2020 est.) in an area of 63.1 km². The elevation is 402 m.

References

Municipalities in São Paulo (state)